The Vienna Observatory is an astronomical observatory in Vienna, Austria. It is part of the University of Vienna. The first observatory was built in 1753–1754 on the roof of one of the university buildings.

A new observatory was built between 1874 and 1879, and was finally inaugurated by Emperor Franz Joseph I of Austria in 1883. At that time, it was the world's largest refracting telescope.

Land for the new observatory was purchased in 1872, and was noted for having increased elevations (about 150 ft) above the city. Construction started in March 1874, and it was opened with new instruments in 1877. The overall design had various rooms and three main domes, one for the Grubb refractor and then two smaller domes, and some terraces.

At this time there were larger aperture reflecting telescopes, and the main technologies of metal mirror and silver on glass; however they had not yet established a strong reputation for themselves and there continued a strong interest in refractors for better or worse until the 20th century.

A report published in the publication Nature in notes that the 69 cm / 27-inch Grubb observed planets, comets, and nebula between 1903 and 1906. Observations with a 6-inch Fraunhofer refractor telescope of comets and planets between 1903 and 1910 was also noted.

Directors 

 1756–1792Maximilian Hell
 1792–1817Franz de Paula Triesnecker
 1819–1840Johann Josef von Littrow
 1842–1877Karl Ludwig von Littrow
 1877–1908Edmund Weiss
 1928–1938Kasimir Graff
 1940–1945Bruno Thüring
 1945–1949Kasimir Graff
 1951–1962Josef Hopmann
 1962–1979Josef Meurers
 1979–1981Karl Rakos
 1981–1984Werner Tscharnuter
 1984–1986Michel Breger
 1986–1994Paul Jackson
 1994–2005Michel Breger
 2006–2009Gerhard Hensler 
 2009–2011Franz Kerschbaum
 2011–2012Manuel Güdel
 2012–2013João Alves
 2013–2018Bodo Ziegler
 2018–2022Manuel Güdel
 2022–pres.Glenn van de Ven

See also 
 List of largest optical refracting telescopes
 Kuffner Observatory (Established in the 1886, also in Vienna)
 List of Jesuit sites

References

External links 

 University of Vienna Institute of Astronomy home page
 Early Asteroid Research in Austria

Astronomical observatories in Austria
Buildings and structures in Währing
Museums in Vienna
Science museums in Austria
University of Vienna
Great refractors
1883 establishments in Austria